Melica hyalina is a species of grass found in Brazil and southern South America.

Description
The leaf-sheaths are tubular and are closed on one end with its surface being glabrous or pilose. The leaf-blades are flat with scaberulous surface and acuminate apex. The main panicle branches are appressed with dominant and scabrous axis.

The pedicels are ciliate, curved, filiform, and hairy above. The spikelets have 2 fertile florets which are diminished at the apex while the sterile florets are barren, lanceolate and clumped.

Its palea have ciliolated keels and smooth surface. The fruits are ellipsoid and caryopses with additional pericarp.

References

hyalina
Endemic flora of Brazil
Flora of South America